Yarkon Park (Park HaYarkon) is a large park in Tel Aviv, Israel, with about sixteen million visits annually. Named after the Yarkon River which flows through it, the park includes extensive lawns, sports facilities, botanical gardens, an aviary, a water park, two outdoor concert venues and lakes. The park covers an area of 3.5 km². At 375 hectares, it is slightly larger than Central Park in New York, and double the size of Hyde Park, London.

History

In 1925, the municipality of Tel Aviv invited urban planner Patrick Geddes to prepare an expansion of the city towards the Yarkon, which was considered the city's natural border. Palestinian and Jewish farmers grew vegetables and maintained orchards on the banks of the river, and Geddes suggested a park should be established on the Yarkon's southern bank. Planting of trees began in the early 1940s, starting on the river's southern bank and expanding eastward with the city, though at that time, without a comprehensive plan. This was implemented for the benefit of the city's European inhabitants, unaccustomed to the region's climate, and with the goal of establishing Jewish ownership, European imagery, and a callback to a biblical landscape likely more verdant than that of the region in the 20th century.

1948 brought about unprecedented change to the region. The mass displacement of Palestinians, along with urban overcrowding caused by the arrival of one million Jews from Europe and the Middle East presented Prime Minister Ben Gurion with an opportunity to establish new parks. In 1950, the government of Israel established 175 hectares on the northern bank of the Yarkon, for the purpose of establishing a park, and a planting project then began on the Yarkon's northern bank. This northern area had been within the village lands of Al-Shaykh Muwannis; today the park also covers parts of the village lands of Jarisha, Al-Mas'udiyya and Al-Jammasin al-Gharbi.

In 1959, the Mapai (Labor Party) came into power  in Tel Aviv. They were already in power on the national level. This union of local and national government allowed the inception of various large scale projects in Tel-Aviv. In 1961, damage to the Yarkon's banks lead the municipality to initiate development of a comprehensive plan for Yarkon Park. When it was opened to the public in 1973, it was called Ganei Yehoshua, honoring Yehoshua Rabinovich, the mayor of Tel Aviv between 1969 and 1974.

Landmarks

The park has six gardens: Gan HaBanim (Fallen Soldiers Memorial Garden), Gan Nifga'ei HaTeror (Terror Victims Memorial Garden), Gan HaSlaim (Rock Garden), Gan HaKaktusim (Cacti Garden), HaGan HaGazum (Trimmed Garden), and HaGan HaTropi (Tropical Garden).

The Seven Mills section of the park contains the remnants of Jarisha/Jarisha Mills, a Palestinian village that was depopulated in the lead up to the 1948 Arab-Israeli War.

Tel Gerisa is an archaeological site in the park, that has been identified by Benjamin Mazar and Yohanan Aharoni with the biblical Gath Rimmon. The landmark preserves the name of the historically nearby Palestinian Arab village of Jarisha, after which the tel was named.

The Rock Garden, one of the largest of its kind in the world, reflects Israel's geological diversity. In its 4-hectare enclosure the rocks are interspersed with some 3,500 species of plants, including over 2.4 hectares of cacti. The 2-hectare Tropical Garden has a wooden walkway shaded by palm trees leading to a small lake. The rainforest-like microclimate supports a large variety of orchids and vines.

The Yarkon River runs through the park and reaches the Mediterranean Sea at the park's western edge, then connects into the Tel Aviv Port, an entertainment and tourism center. Despite clean-up efforts in the last few years, the river is still polluted. Despite its polluted waters, in July 2011 Tel Aviv's mayor, Ron Huldai, jumped into the water and swam in the lake. Nevertheless, the region has retained its biodiversity. It is home to an abundance of insects, water fowl, golden jackals, porcupines and mongoose.

Events

Many popular musical acts have played the park, including Michael Jackson, Bob Dylan, Paul McCartney, The Rolling Stones, Peter Gabriel, Madonna, David Bowie, Carlos Santana, Dire Straits, Bon Jovi, Elton John, Aerosmith, Metallica, U2, Depeche Mode, Guns N' Roses, Red Hot Chili Peppers, Ugly Kid Joe, Linkin Park, Ozzy Osbourne, Joe Cocker, Morrissey, Eurythmics, Westlife, Five, Justin Timberlake, Robbie Williams, Rihanna, Sia, OneRepublic, Lady Gaga, Justin Bieber, Rod Stewart, Queen + Adam Lambert, Britney Spears and Jennifer Lopez.

American singer Britney Spears performed in the park on July 3, 2017, as part of her Britney: Live in Concert. It was attended by a crowd of 60,000 people. Due to the concert, the Israeli Labor Party delayed their election for a new chairperson by a day. It was originally scheduled for July 3, the same day as Spears's concert, but party officials feared traffic jams and that party members would choose the concert over finding a polling station.

Michael Jackson performed there, on September 19/21, 1993 during his Dangerous World Tour attended by a crowd of 80,000 people in the first show and 100,000 people in the second show.

Italian opera house La Scala performed a free outdoor concert of Verdi's Requiem in the park as a part of Tel Aviv's 100th anniversary celebrations, attracting about 100,000 people.

American singer Jennifer Lopez performed in the park as part of her It's My Party (tour) on August 1, 2019. It was attended by a crowd of 57,000 people.

Concerts

See also
Biodiversity in Israel
List of national parks and nature reserves of Israel
Tourism in Israel
National Sport Center – Tel Aviv

References

External links
 Yarkon National Park at the Israel Nature and National Parks Protection Authority
 Yarkon Park

Parks in Tel Aviv
National parks of Israel
Urban public parks
Gardens in Israel